The Guardian is the seventh novel by the American writer Nicholas Sparks.
The book is about a Great Dane named Singer who is the pet of a widow named Julie who is trying to find a new life partner. Among those she considers are Mike, an old friend of hers, and Richard, a successful manager.

Themes
The novel deals with the themes of obsessive love, as it attempts to show the inner world of a highly intelligent murderer living with no ethics at all.

References

External links
Cover, first six pages and back of the novel
Official Nicholas Sparks website

2003 American novels
American romance novels
Novels by Nicholas Sparks